The Jaguar S-Type is an executive car that debuted at the 1998 Birmingham Motor Show and was marketed by Jaguar for model years 1999-2007, reviving the nameplate of the company's 1963-68 S-Type as a four-door notchback saloon. The S-Type received a mild facelift for model year 2002 and again in 2004. The S-Type was discontinued in late 2007 and replaced by the XF.

Overview
After being privatised in 1984, Jaguar had been developing a smaller saloon to complement the XJ6 by the early 1990s, but these plans were axed following its takeover by Ford in 1989, only to resurface within a few years. 

The S-Type was produced at Jaguar's Castle Bromwich facility in Birmingham, England. The car was styled by Geoff Lawson in 1995 and is based on the Jaguar DEW platform/Ford DEW platform, shared with the Lincoln LS and Ford Thunderbird. It was unveiled at the Birmingham International Motor Show on 20 October 1998, and went on sale in January 1999. It was aimed at buyers of cars including the BMW 5 Series.

The first S-Types ("X200" 1999–2002) are distinguished by a U-shaped centre console and optional touchscreen navigation system in the 2003 and later models. The traditional leaping jaguar bonnet ornament was optional and is approved by the US and EU standards and breaks away in the case of an accident. Subsequent models ("X202", "X204", "X206"; the last digit denoting the model year) have the Jaguar logo incorporated within the radiator grille and a more traditional 'looped' styling for the centre console. In Australia, the "leaper" bonnet ornament did not become available until 2004.

The supercharged S-Type R (Jaguar STR for short) joined the lineup in 2002, and the hope was that it would compete with BMW's M5 and the Mercedes E55 AMG. The top speed was limited to 155 mph. It included 18-inch (457-millimeter) alloy wheels, wire-mesh grille, and monochromatic paint. The R also has a rear apron, side-skirts, and front apron with built-in fog-lamps, a rear spoiler, a brace located near the rear subframe, and R badging on the boot lid and both front fenders (wings).

The Jaguar S-Type R is able to produce an extra 20 bhp with a modified pulley.

Also added on the 2003 model was an electronic parking-brake paddle-switch that replaced the conventional manually operated lever for the rear brakes. The 2003 model featured a revised dash, centre console, and a grille with the Jaguar badge to give the vehicle a more Jaguar-like appearance, and a flip-open key was devised for the ignition.

The windscreen washer jets were incorporated into the windscreen wiper arms. There were no changes made to the cabin interior. 2006 to 2007 models featured no fog lights.

Powertrain
The S-Type was powered by a variety of petrol and diesel engines. At launch, the V8 S-Type was powered by the 4.0L Jaguar AJ-V8 engine, the capacity of which was increased to 4.2L for the 2003 model year. Variants of this engine are used in Ford, Lincoln, Land Rover/Range Rover and Aston Martin models. The V6 petrol engines used were originally conceived by Porsche for use in a replacement 944, before being picked up by Ford to be developed into the Ford Duratec unit which is used extensively throughout the Ford model range (and in Ford subsidiary companies). With the Jaguar 3.0L version benefitting from Jaguar designed heads, variable valve timing and an additional 30bhp over the original Ford Duratec. 
The 2.5 L V6 engine was not available for vehicles exported to the United States and Canada.  Diesel engines are the Ford/Peugeot 2.7L HDi Ford AJD-V6/PSA DT17 which is used in a number of Ford, Peugeot, Citroën, Jaguar and Land Rover models.

From model years 1999 to 2002, the rear-wheel-drive S-Type was equipped with either a five-speed manual  or a five-speed J-Gate Ford 5R55N transmission. From 2003, the S-Type was produced with either a 5-speed manual transmission (Getrag 221)  or a six-speed J-Gate ( ZF 6HP26 transmission) that allows automatic manual gear selection. The 2004 diesel saw the introduction of a 6-speed manual transmission; it was also available with the six-speed J-Gate automatic transmission.

Specifications

Safety

Reception

The car was praised on its release for its interior and ride. In particular, the 2.7 V6 twin-turbodiesel engine was described as 'a paragon of refinement, quietness, and fuel economy' by the European automotive press, with enough 'refinement and performance to wean anyone off petrol power'. The supercharged 'R' version was also praised for its speed and for 'proper rear-drive Jag' handling, however the lack of a limited-slip differential was criticised, along with whine from the Eaton supercharger. The car, particularly the 3.0 Sport manual, was described by the Honest John website, as the spiritual successor to the Jaguar Mark 2.

References

External links

S-Type
Executive cars
Mid-size cars
Retro-style automobiles
Rear-wheel-drive vehicles
2000s cars
Cars introduced in 1998
Sports sedans